Tommaso Mocenigo (1343–1423) was doge (chief magistrate) of the Republic of Venice from 1414 until his death.

Biography
He commanded the crusading fleet in the expedition to Nicopolis in 1396 and also won battles against the Genoese during the War of Chioggia of 1378–1381.  

While he was Venetian ambassador at Cremona, he was elected doge (1414), and he escaped in secret, fearing that he might be held a prisoner by Gabrino Fondolo, tyrant of that city. He made peace with the Turkish sultan, but, when hostilities broke out afresh, his fleet defeated that of the Turks at the Battle of Gallipoli.  

During his reign, the patriarch of Aquileia Louis of Teck formed an anti-Venetian alliance with Emperor Sigismund. Venice, under a double-sided attack, was able to launch an offensive that, in 1419-1420, conquered Udine, Cividale, Feltre, Belluno and most of Friuli from the Aquileian patriarchate. The Cadore also surrendered spontaneously. The ensuing treaty led to a peace with Hungary and the annexation of the patriarchate's lands to the Republic of Venice.

Mocenigo greatly encouraged commerce, reconstructed the ducal palace and commenced the library. He died after a long illness in 1423. He was interred in the Basilica di San Giovanni e Paolo, a traditional burial place of the doges.

See also
Mocenigo family

References

1343 births
1423 deaths
14th-century Venetian people
15th-century Doges of Venice
Christians of the Battle of Nicopolis
Tommaso
Dukes of Crete
Burials at Santi Giovanni e Paolo, Venice